Hassan Rouhani was the seventh President of Iran which governs during his second term within the twelfth government of the Islamic Republic of Iran.

Cabinet members

|-

|-
!colspan=7|* Acting
|-

Women appointees 
Despite the pressure coming from his supporters and women's rights activists to appoint female ministers, Rouhani did not name any woman as minister, however he appointed three women in his second administration,  Masoumeh Ebtekar and Laya Joneydi as vice presidents and Shahindokht Molaverdi as his aide for citizenship rights.

See also
Government of Iran
Government of Hassan Rouhani (2013–17)

References

Presidency of Hassan Rouhani
2017 establishments in Iran
Iran
Rouhani